Megasandesam is a 2001 Indian Malayalam-language horror film directed by Rajasenan and starring Suresh Gopi,  Rajasree Nair, Samyuktha Varma and Napoleon.
The film was an average hit in boxoffice .

Plot
Balagopal (Suresh Gopi) is an alumnus and professor in a college. He is engaged to Anjali (Samyuktha Varma). Anjali is an heir to one of the royal families who owns a huge estate and bungalow in Ooty. Her father's brother tries to extort her. To help Anjali, Balagopal goes to Ooty. On the way, he meets a girl Rosy (Rajashree), who asks for a lift. On the way they get to know each other and become good friends after dropping her, when Balagopal sees a sweater left by Rosy. He goes back to give it in the home where he left her. There he realises that she was long dead. On coming back to the bungalow, he meets Rosy's ghost who was waiting for him there, she tell him her past, Rosy is a student in the same college as Balagopal, she has a huge crush on him, but never expresses it openly to him or meets him in person. She decides to express her desire to him after getting permission from her parents, but on the way she has an accident and dies. Balagopal sympathises with Rosy and treats her as a friend, Rosy even helps Balagopal when goons sent by Anjali's uncle attack him. It all changes when she realises that Balagopal is in love with Anjali, she becomes possessive of him. When Anjali and her family come to Ooty to stay with Balagopal, Rosy attempts multiple times to threaten her and  kill her. To find a solution, she approaches a priest in the church, he guides them to Father Rosario, who hails from the family of fabled exorcists. Father Rosario arrives and prevents many attacks of Rosy. He tries to talk to rosy in a prayer session, in that he realises that Rosy has denounced God and her powers are becoming evil. When he discusses it with another priest, Fr. Rosario learns that Rosy has not been baptised due to her father who was an atheist, it  was reason for Rosy's spirit to denounce God. When Rosy's father learns of his daughter's fate he accepts to undergo baptism for her benefit. Fr. Rosario plans to agitate Rosy bring out the evil in her so that when her body is baptised it dies. Fr. Rosario plans to conduct the marriage of both Anjali and Balagopal, during which Rosy attacks in full fury becoming a total evil spirit, so when baptised she retains her original calm form.

Cast
Suresh Gopi... Balagopal
Rajasree Nair... Rosy Samuel
Samyuktha Varma... Anjali Varma
Napoleon... Fr. Rosario
Oduvil Unnikrishnan... Easwara Varma
Harisree Ashokan... Kuttikrishnan
Indrans... Thommy
Narendra Prasad... Samuel
Urmila Unni... Mariya
Abhirami... Kavitha
Mallika Sukumaran... College Professor
K. T. S. Padannayil... Chandran Nair
Geetha Salam... Grandfather of Rosy
Ullaass... Friend of Rosy Samuel

See also 
 List of Malayalam horror films

References

External links
 

2000s Malayalam-language films
2001 horror films
2000s romance films
2001 films
Indian romantic horror films
Films shot in Ooty
Films scored by M. G. Radhakrishnan
Films directed by Rajasenan